Pune Pride is an annual LGBT pride parade that was first held in Pune, Maharashtra on 11 December 2011. It is the second Pride parade to be organized in the state of Maharashtra, after the Queer Azaadi Mumbai Pride March.

History of Pune Pride Parade 
The city saw its first pride march also known as the "Gay Pride & HIV awareness march" in the old city area of Pune on 11 December 2011 where around 50 people from the LGBT community and equal number of supporters participated. It was organised by Samapathik Trust which is a men's sexual health organization. Participants were requested to not wear masks or paint their faces and to not engage in "skin show".

2011
The 11 December 2011 parade was the first open pride parade event in Pune's history, and was organized by SAMAPATHIK TRUST, Pune (Reg. No E3662)(founded by Gay Activist Bindumadhav Khire). Samapathik Trust Staff had requested participants, who numbered around 50-60 according to Daily News and Analysis, (actual participants were 93) to not wear masks and to wear professional clothing in order to reflect the culturally-conservative "ethos" of the city. Participants who came from Mumbai noted the comparatively subdued atmosphere of the parade in comparison to the more-flamboyant atmosphere of Pride events in Mumbai. The parade was preceded the previous day by a Queer Fest in the Kala Chhaya, which was organized by Open Space, Birds of a Feather, The Queer Chronicle which is India's longest running LGBT monthly online magazine (Source: Indian Express, 8 November 2012) and Quintessence and hosted over 200 participants.

2012
Pune witnessed its 2nd queer pride parade organized by Samapathik Trust on 9 December 2012. The pride parade focused upon breaking the stereotypical image of Queer people in the films and TV serials and creating awareness about the same along with clearing the misconceptions about the Gay community.

2013
On 24 November 2013, The third edition of Pune pride saw more than 150 people from the LGBT community and allies walking the pride and showing their support towards the LGBTQ community. The parade started from Pune Sarvajanik Sabha at 11AM and it was led by the Sonal Giani and other members from Umang Trust in order to spread the sensitization about issues faced by Lesbian, Bisexual and Transmen from the Queer community. The highlight of the pride was the open support shown by Police department led by Inspector Bhanupratap Barge, whose team distributed Red Roses to the participants as a gesture of support and cooperation towards the rights of the community.

2014
The fourth edition of the Pune LGBT Pride March will be held on Sunday, 9 November 2014, Organized by Samapathik Trust, Pune. The Theme of this year would be "Youngistan Zindabaad". As the theme suggests, The focus was on addressing the issues faced by the youngsters because it is very important for them to accept their sexuality and be aware of their rights. To incorporate more youths, the organizers have changed the route of the march, While earlier it used to be a walk through Laxmi Road and the Peth areas, this time around they will follow the JM Road and FC Road route.

2015 
On 23 August 2015 the fifth edition of Pune pride was organized by Samapathik Trust. The march started at 11AM from Sambaji Park at JM Road with participants from various cities walking down the lanes with posters and banners, colorful clothes and rainbow umbrellas with them. The pride theme this year was "Addressing the Transgender rights", in order to focus the issues related with the discrimination and harassment faced by Hijra/Transgender community due to section 377. There was a special bus being arranged by an organization called "Gay Bombay" to provide an easy conveyance for the participants from Mumbai willing to attend this Pride.

2016 
The sixth edition of Pune pride was organized by Samapathik Trust founded by Mr. Bindumadhav Khire on Sunday, 7 August 2016. The parade started from Sambhaji Park and following Fergusson college road it ended at back to JM Road. The pride theme for this year was "Inclusivity at workplace" to address the discrimination and challenges faced by LGBTQ employees in the corporate environment. Despite heavy rain, the pride march received a rousing response from the Queer community. It was the first time when the representatives from the multinational corporations like IBM, Symantec and ThoughtWorks showed their active participation by attending the pride carrying supporting banners and T-shirts.

2017 
The Seventh edition of Pune Pride took place on 11 June 2017 with a huge number of 700 people walking the pride this time. This pride is organized every year since 2011 by Samapathik Trust founded by Mr. Bindumadhav Khire. This year the Pride parade received an open support by many known corporates like IBM, ADP, Thoughtworks, Symantec, Accenture, Symantec and The Bank of New York Mellon. The pride started at 10:30 AM from The Chhatrapati Sambhaji Garden, went down to Garware Chowk and ended at JM Road. The pride theme for this year was to express the gratitude towards parents, families and allies of LGBTQ people for their understanding, acceptance and due support. This was the first time when the grand Marshalls for the pride were the parents, siblings, Allies and friends of LGBTQ people leading the pride and spreading the message of supporting the cause. The pride also received opposition from the participants due to its stringent rules asking the people to wear decent clothes and not to use any placards or slogans which are against Supreme Court, political parties, leaders, religion and caste.

2018 
The Pune Pride march in 2018 was once again organised by the Samapathik Trust took place on 3 June and more than 800 community members and supporters were in attendance. The march was supported by prominent organisations including Humsafar Trust, Umang Organisation For Lesbian Bisexual and Transgender Women and Sweekar, and the Rainbow Parents of India. The pride also saw the support of the local police force as well as corporate houses. Veteran activists Ashok Row Kavi and Vivek Raj Anand from Humsafar Trust were felicitated at the event.

2019 
The ninth (9th) Pune LGBTIQ pride walk was organized by 'Indradhanu Committee' on 2 June 2019, a wing of 'Samapathik Trust'. Omkar Joshi, Sagar Barve and Sukrut Deshpande served as committee members. Dr. Jyoti Shetty, Psychiatrist, Bharati Vidyapith and Hospital, Pune was invited as Grand Marshal for the pride walk. There was marked presence of associates from corporate organizations viz. Cummins India, HSBC Bank, Northern Trust, Infosys, IBM, and Tata Consultancy Services (TCS) during the pride walk. Around 1000 participants attended the pride walk.

2022 
After two years of gap due to the pandemic, Pune pride happened with the theme "Traditional Pride" on 5 June 2022. It started from Sambhaji Maharaj Garden near Deccan Pune and ended at the Fergusson College gate.

See also 

 Queer Azaadi Mumbai Pride March
 Orange City LGBT Pride March

References

Culture of Pune
Pride parades in India
2011 establishments in Maharashtra
Recurring events established in 2011
Events in Pune